Joseph Anderson (November 20, 1889 – March 13, 1992) was the secretary to the First Presidency of the Church of Jesus Christ of Latter-day Saints (LDS Church) from 1922 to 1970 and was a general authority of the church from 1970 until his death.

Anderson was born in Salt Lake City, Utah Territory in 1889, the same year that Wilford Woodruff became President of the Church.  Anderson graduated from the Weber Stake Academy (now Weber State University) in 1905.  A few years later he served as a missionary in Germany and Switzerland.

Anderson became secretary to the First Presidency of the church in 1922. On 6 April 1970, church president Joseph Fielding Smith released Anderson from his secretarial duties and called him to serve as an Assistant to the Quorum of the Twelve Apostles. When that calling was abolished in 1976, Anderson was ordained a Seventy and became a member of the First Quorum of the Seventy. In 1978, Anderson became an emeritus general authority and was relieved of his day-to-day duties as a Seventy. Anderson died in Salt Lake City at the age of 102 and was buried at Salt Lake City Cemetery.

Anderson is one of three church general authorities to reach the age of 100.  The others are former Presiding Patriarch, Eldred G. Smith, who in 2009 surpassed Anderson as the longest-lived general authority in LDS Church history, and the third is emeritus general authority Robert L. Backman.

Anderson married Norma Ettie Peterson in 1915. The couple had three children.

See also
 D. Arthur Haycock

Notes

References
"Elder Joseph Anderson Eulogized", Ensign, May 1992, p. 105.

External links
Grampa Bill's G.A. Pages: Joseph Anderson

1889 births
1992 deaths
20th-century Mormon missionaries
American Mormon missionaries in Germany
American Mormon missionaries in Switzerland
American centenarians
American general authorities (LDS Church)
Assistants to the Quorum of the Twelve Apostles
Burials at Salt Lake City Cemetery
Members of the First Quorum of the Seventy (LDS Church)
Men centenarians
People from Salt Lake City
Secretaries to the First Presidency (LDS Church)
Weber State University alumni